Placental villous immaturity is chorionic villous development that is inappropriate for the gestational age.

It is associated with diabetes mellitus
and fetal death near term, i.e. intrauterine demise close to the normal gestational period.

Pathology
Immature chorionic villi are larger and have more central blood vessels; thus, the diffusion distance for gas and nutrient exchange is larger and, therefore, placental function is impaired.

See also
Placenta
Placental pathology

References

External links 

Health issues in pregnancy